Arakkonam Junction railway station (station code: AJJ) is a railway station in Ranipet district, Tamil Nadu. It is one of the oldest railway stations in India, located on the first railway line in South India. It is located on the Guntakal–Chennai Egmore section of Mumbai–Chennai line of the Southern Railway zone.
Arakkonam junction is also feature in a song "Vellarikka" of movie Kadhal Kottai starring Ajith Kumar and Devayani.

Lines from Arakkonam Junction

Routes having quadruple tracks  

Services

Originating trains

Passing trains

Loco shed

Electric Loco Shed, Arakkonam is a motive power depot performing locomotive maintenance and repair facility for electric locomotives of the Southern Railway zone in Tamil Nadu, India. It is one of the three electric locomotive sheds of the Southern Railway, the others being at Erode (ED) and Royapuram (RPM) and is the oldest in south India. As of 1 November 2020 there are 184 locomotives in the shed mainly WAP-4, WAG-5 HA and WAG-9H 184 locos near the station. It is also one of the last sheds to home the hugely successful WAM-4 class locomotives.

See also
Chennai Suburban Railway

References

Railway junction stations in Tamil Nadu
Railway stations in Vellore district
Chennai railway division